Cyprian Bloomfield (6 March 1900 – 9 July 1983) was a Jamaican cricketer. He played in one first-class match for the Jamaican cricket team in 1925/26.

See also
 List of Jamaican representative cricketers

References

External links
 

1900 births
1983 deaths
Jamaican cricketers
Jamaica cricketers
Sportspeople from Kingston, Jamaica